Clay Meredith Greene (March 12, 1850 – September 5, 1933) was an American playwright.

Biography
He was born on March 12, 1850, in San Francisco, California, to William Harrison Greene (1812–1871) and Anne Elizabeth Fisk (1830–1901). He studied at Santa Clara University and was part of the graduating class of 1869. He was author to fifty plays and opera librettos. He was known for such plays as M'liss, Struck Oil, Blue Beard, Little Trooper, and The Golden Giant.

He died on September 5, 1933, in San Francisco, California.

Filmography as writer
 M'Liss – 1918
 Struck Oil
 Blue Beard
 Little Trooper
 The Golden Giant
 The Climbers – 1915
The Great Ruby (1915)
 The Fortune Hunter – 1914
 The House Next Door – 1914
 Verses of Love, Sentiment and Friendship – 1921

References

External links
 
 

1850 births
1933 deaths
Santa Clara University alumni
The Lambs presidents